Master James of Saint George (–1309; French: , Old French: Mestre Jaks, Latin: Magister Jacobus de Sancto Georgio) was a master of works/architect from Savoy, described by historian Marc Morris as "one of the greatest architects of the European Middle Ages". He was largely responsible for designing King Edward I's castles in North Wales, including Conwy, Harlech and Caernarfon (all begun in 1283) and Beaumaris on Anglesey (begun 1295).

Origin and early life

There is little firm documentary evidence of James’ early life and origin.  However, we have very strong circumstantial evidence that his place of birth was Saint-Prex in or around the year 1230. We know for certain that his father was also an architect mason named John. This strong evidence related to his father, including year of death and architectural style lead to the conclusion that John was Jean Cotereel the builder of Saint-Prex and Lausanne Cathedral. Of particular interest are the similarities of the rose windows at Canterbury Cathedral and Lausanne Cathedral and the similarity of the west window of Lausanne Cathedral to that of the eastern hall window later built at Conwy Castle.

Alpine works

The career of “Magistro Jacobo” began with the construction for Peter II, Count of Savoy of Yverdon-les-Bains Castle. At Yverdon James was at first working with his father John, but by 1265 he is recorded as working alone, likely indicating the death of his father. From his apprenticeship to his father he went on to work under the guidance of an engineer from Gascony, who had previously worked for Henry III of England, Jean de Mézos.

Following the death of Peter II, Count of Savoy in 1268 he went on to work for his successor, Philip I, Count of Savoy. Unlike Peter, who had preferred Chillon Castle as his main residence, Philip preferred the Viennois which was closer to his former see of Lyon. We know from recently highlighted sources from the Savoyard archive that James did indeed have a house at Saint-Georges up until his subsequent move to England. The first reference to this name in English records is Magistri Jacobi Di Sancto Georgio on 8 November 1280, two years after his arrival into England. His patron, King Edward I, probably met Master James of St George whilst returning from Crusade and visiting Savoy in 1273. It was 25 June 1273 that King Edward I of England visited  so that his great-uncle Philip I, Count of Savoy might pay homage to him in fulfilment of an earlier 1246 treaty whereby the castles of Bard, Avigliana, the palace of Susa and town of Saint-Maurice had been enfeoffed to the King of England.

It is very possible that the simultaneous construction of these castles, three round tower castles and one octagonal tower palace castle, influenced Edward’s decision to hire him to construct the castles in north Wales.

There is an archival gap of the career of Magistro Jacobo between 1275 when he is last recorded in Savoy and 1278 when first recorded in Britain. Marshall has suggested that he may have been working at this time for the family of Otto de Grandson who was close to both Edward I of England and the comital family of Savoy. Such work may have included Grandson Castle and Lucens Castle. 

Historian and Author A. J. Taylor uncovered, what had been a mystery for centuries in discovering, the Savoyard origins of James, that  and Master James of Saint George were one and the same man. Taylor travelled from Wales to Savoy noting for the first time the origins of the Welsh works in Savoy. Taylor citing the garderobes at La Bâtiaz Castle, the windows at Chillon Castle along with the town walls at Saillon as examples

British works

Following the short war of 1277 between Edward I of England and Llywelyn ap Gruffudd, following the latter’s refusal to pay due homage, James was called from Savoy to England to the service of the king. The earliest references in the English records of James of St George are found in April 1278 describing him as "" translates as “going to Wales to put in order the works of the castles” there, that is the Mason charged with the design, technical direction and management of the works underway in Wales He is recorded as travelling to Wales, "" at which time four new castles were being built: Flint, Rhuddlan, Builth and Aberystwyth. Historian A. J. Taylor records that from 1277 until 1280 his main work was to supervise the building of Rhuddlan Castle and the canalisation of the River Clwyd before turning to Flint. Flint Castle is similar in concept to that built by Master James earlier at Yverdon-les-Bains

He was appointed Master of the Royal Works in Wales around 1285, drawing a wage of 3s. a day. This appointment gave him control of construction in all its aspects of castles at Conwy, Caernarfon and Harlech. An example of the way in which he brought the finer points of architecture from Savoy to north Wales would be three pinnacled merlons to be found at the :it:Castello di San Giorio di Susa and at Conwy Castle. We now have primary sources that establish a direct link placing Master James at both Susa and Conwy Castle. 
Harlech Castle, begun in 1283, was effectively completed in 1289. On 3 July 1290, James of St George was appointed Constable of Harlech Castle, succeeding John de Bonvillars who had died in August 1287. He held this position until 14 December 1293.

His final Welsh castle was Beaumaris, on which work started in April 1295. Described by historian Marc Morris as Master James' "most perfectly conceived castle", it remained unfinished on his death in 1309.

James of St George had joined Edward I in Scotland, probably around September 1298. In February 1302, James of St George was appointed to oversee to the new defences at Linlithgow. He had also worked at Stirling during the siege of 1304.

There is no record of James's wife, Ambrosia, receiving a pension after his death, so it is probable she did not survive him. He would be survived by his two sons, Giles and Tassin of Saint George.

References

Bibliography

 
 
 
 
  
 
 

1230 births
1309 deaths
13th-century architects
14th-century architects
Stonemasons
Swiss architects
Savoyards in Thirteenth Century England